Ministro Zenteno was a protected cruiser of the Chilean Navy.

Construction and design
In November 1894, the Brazilian government placed an order for three protected cruisers with the British shipyard Armstrong, Mitchell & Company. The first of these ships was laid down on 6 May 1895 at Armstrong's Elswick shipyard, but financial difficulties resulted in the first installment for the ship being delayed, and it was instead sold to the Chilean government in September 1895. At first, the ship was to be named Chacabucu, but was launched with the name Ministro Zenteno on 1 February 1896. Work continued for Brazil on the remaining two ships, with another cruiser ordered to the same design to replace Ministro Zenteno, but only one, was operated by Brazil, with the other two ships, Amazonas (later ) and Almirante Abreu (later ), purchased by the United States Navy on the eve of the Spanish–American War.

The ship's main gun armament consisted of eight 6-in (152 mm) 45-calibre quick-firing guns, with two fore-and-aft on the ship's centreline, and three on each beam. The secondary armament was ten 6-pounder (57mm) guns and four 3-pounder (47mm) guns. The ship was fitted with three 18-inch (450mm) torpedo tubes, one fixed in the bow and the other two on swivelling mounts on the ship's broadside.

Service
Ministro Zenteno attended the Pan-American Conference in Mexico in 1901.

In 1907 she sailed off Valparaíso for a training cruise bound for Punta Arenas, Bahía, La Guaira, Bermudas, Hampton Roads, Annapolis, Newport, Plymouth, Brest, El Ferrol, Lisboa, Argel, Malta, Spezia, Genova, Barcelona, Cartagena, Gibraltar, Santa Cruz de Tenerife, Río de Janeiro, Buenos Aires, Puerto Madryn, Punta Arenas, Puerto Montt, Talcahuano, and back to Valparaíso on 8 December 1907.

See also
 South American dreadnought race
 List of decommissioned ships of the Chilean Navy

Endnotes

References
 Brooke, Peter. Warships for Export: Armstrong Warships 1867–1927. Gravesend, UK: World Ship Society, 1999. .
 Chesneau, Roger and Eugene M. Kolesnik. Conway's All the World's Fighting Ships 1860–1905. London: Conway's Maritime Press, 1979. .
 Scheina, Robert L. Latin America: A Naval History, 1810–1987. Annapolis, MD: Naval Institute Press, 1987. . .

External links
 
 Chilean Navy website Crucero Ministro Zenteno
 Spanish newspaper Blanco y Negro on 14 September 1907 about the visit of the Ministro Zenteno in Barcelona on 5 February 1907

Cruisers of the Chilean Navy
1896 ships
Ships built by Armstrong Whitworth